Pauliasi is a given name. Notable people with the name include:

 Pauliasi Manu (born 1987), New Zealand rugby union player
 Pauliasi Tabulutu (born 1967), Fijian rugby union player

See also
 Pauliasi "Asi" Taulava (born 1973), Tongan-born Filipino basketball player

Polynesian given names